The 48th Annual Australian Film Institute Awards ceremony, honouring the best in film and television acting achievements for the year 2006 in the cinema of Australia, took place on 6–7 December 2006. During the ceremony, the Australian Film Institute presented Australian Film Institute Awards (commonly referred to as AFI Awards) in 40 categories including feature films, television, animation, and documentaries. It was hosted by Geoffrey Rush.

Winners of major awards
''This is a breakdown of winners of major awards categories only. For a complete list of nominees and winners, see

Film

Additional awards

Television

Series

Directing

Acting

Writing

References

Film
A
A
2006 in Australian cinema